Provine is a surname. Notable people with the surname include:

Dorothy Provine (1935–2010), American singer, dancer, and actress
J. W. Provine (1866–1949), American chemistry professor and university president
Walter M. Provine (1873–1955), American lawyer
Will Provine (1942–2015), American historian